Brisbane 1990–1993 is a compilation of the two early 90s EP’s by the Australian band Custard, Gastanked and Brisbane.

Track listing

References

External links
 AllMusic review

2001 albums
Custard (band) compilation albums